1960–61 Oberliga may refer to:

 1960–61 Oberliga, a West German association football season
 1960 DDR-Oberliga, an East German association football season
 1960–61 DDR-Oberliga (ice hockey) season, an East German ice hockey season